Bhavesh or Bhavish or Bhawesh  is a given Indian male name. It supposedly originates from the Sanskrit words bhāva, which means "existence", and eesh, which means "Ishvara"  "Lord, Ruler". It means "Lord Shiva" as well.

References

Indian masculine given names